Elijah Alexander Baker (born 30 May 1991) is an English actor, writer, and director. He founded his own independent production company, Enuff Talk Productions, in 2016.

Filmography

Music videos 
 RXD – "Man in the Dark" (2013)

References 
 Interview with NWD
 Interview with The British Blacklist
 Somme Theatre at National Lottery Awards 2007

External links 
 

Black British male actors
Living people
1991 births